August Winding (24 March 183516 June 1899) was a Danish pianist, teacher and composer.

Life

Early life and education
August Henrik Winding was born in Tårs, near Sandby on the island of Lolland. His father was a clergyman who collected and arranged Danish folk songs, and also an excellent pianist who became his son's first music teacher. August’s three brothers were equally highly musical, most of all his brother Peter Buonaventura who, despite his early death at the age of 16, had some of his works published. In 1847, August’s parents sent the 12 year old to Copenhagen for musical education. He stayed there at the house of J.P.E. Hartmann and was given piano lessons by Carl Reinecke until the latter’s departure for Paris in 1848, and then by Anton Rée (1820-1886), who had been an acquaintance of Frédéric Chopin. He also was taught theory and composition by Niels Gade.  In 1856 he went to Leipzig for further studies, and then had  lessons with Alexander Dreyschock in Prague. who called him «the best of his pupils hitherto».

Pianist
His public career was originally as a pianist; he became rapidly the leading pianist of his days in Denmark, but also played in many countries of Europe, specialising in Beethoven and Mozart.  His "calling card" was Beethoven's 4th Piano Concerto.

In 1864 he married J. P. E. Hartmann's daughter Clara (Niels Gade married another daughter). In 1867 he became a teacher at the Royal Danish Conservatory in Copenhagen and also privately.

August Winding was one of Edvard Grieg's closest friends.

Arm injury and career as a composer
In 1867 he injured his arm through overwork, which forced his retirement as a performer but also enabled him to devote himself to composing.  In 1881, he resumed his pedagogical activity at the conservatorium.  Between 1888 and his death he gave some further concerts.

Death and legacy
August Winding died in 1899 in Copenhagen, aged 64. He is buried in Søllerød graveyard. He was survived by a daughter, Ingeborg Winding (1871-1908), a painter and the mother of architects and designers  Mogens and Flemming Lassen,  and a son,  Poul Andreas Winding (1877-1966), a violinist.

Style and legacy
His music was for many years virtually forgotten, apart from some hymn tunes, but attention is now being paid to his major works.

Compositions
 Orchestral
 Nordic Overture, Op. 7 (1864)
Concert Overture (published in 1885), Op. 14
 Symphony in C minor, Op. 39, dedicated to Emil Hartmann
Symphony (1858-59)
 Ballet Fjeldstuen (The Mountain Hut, or Twenty Years; 1859; co-written with his brother-in law Emil Hartmann).  Winding wrote the first part, and among others:
 "Sæterpigernes Dands om det nydødbte Barn"
 "Huldredands"
 "Springdands"
 Concertante
 Violin Concerto in A major, Op. 11 (created by Wilhelmine Neruda on 2 March 1867 in Copenhagen)
Piano Concerto in A minor, Op. 16
 Concert Allegro in C minor, Op. 29, for piano and orchestra
 Chamber works
 First Sonata for violin and piano, in g minor, Op. 5 (dedicated to Wilhelmine Neruda)
Sonata for cello and piano, Op. 10 (1854, manuscript, dedicated to J.P.E. Hartmann)
Piano Quartet in D major, Op. 17 (created at the GewandhausGewandhaus in Leipzig)
 Three Fantasy Pieces, Op. 19, for clarinet or violin and piano (1872)
 String Quintet in D, Op. 23 (2 violins, 2 violas, cello)
 Second Sonata for violin and piano, Op. 35
Elegi for violin (or Oboe) and piano, Op. 41
Aftenstemning for violin and organ or piano, Op. 47 b
Miniature Suite for violin and piano
Three Canzonettas for violin and piano
 Piano pieces
 Three Fantasy Pieces, Op. 1
Reisebilder (Eight pieces), Op. 3
Four Pieces (Festmarsch, Intermezzo, Scherzo, Romance), Op. 6
Landlige Scener: Skizzer for Piano (Seven Pieces), Op. 9
 Studier og Stemninger (Six Pieces), Op. 10
Allegro, Romance, Finale, Op. 13
Genrebilleder (Twelve Pieces dedicated to Franz Neruda), Op. 15
Ten Pieces in Etudeform, Op. 18
Aus der Ferienzeit (Sommerminder, Seven Pieces for Piano), Op. 22
Five Pieces in Etudeform, Op. 24
Tonebilleder (Four Pieces), Op. 25
 Preludes in all the Keys, Op. 26 (Dedicated to Isidor Seiss):
 1. in C major: Poco Adagio, maestoso e con nobilità
 2. in A minor: Allegro agitato ed affetuoso
 3. in F major: Comodo
 4. in D minor: Allegro risoluto e energico
 5. in B major: Allegro non troppo. Giocoso, con allegrezza
 6. in G minor: Moderato con fierezza
 7. in E major: Andante innocente e tenero
 8. in C minor: Presto impetuoso
 9. in A major: Allegro non troppo con dolcezza
 10. in F minor: Allegro moderato, poco agitato
 11. in D major: Con moto. Soave e con grazia
 12. in B minor: Andantino quasi Allegretto, Grave e mesto
 13. in G major: Allegro vivace con calore e molt’ animato
 14. in E minor: Presto furioso e con strepito
 15. in B major: Allegretto tranquillo e dolce
 16. in G minor: Allegretto dolente e malinconico
 17. in E major: Moderato grazioso e con tenerezza
 18. in C minor: Allegro energico e molt’ appassionato
 19. in A major: Allegretto dolce e piacevole
 20. in F minor: Andantino con duolo
 21. in D major: Allegro con vivacità ed anima
 22. in B minor: Adagio grave e lugubre
 23. in G major: Allegro molto con gran vivacità
 24. in E minor: Andante sostenuto, quasi una fantasia
 25. Postludium in C major: Poco Adagio, maestoso e con nobilità.
Three Pieces for the left hand (Capriccio, Canzonetta, Finale), Op  27
Kontraster (Thirteen Pieces), Op. 28
Sange ved Klaveret, Op. 30 (Four Pieces, Im Winter, Im Mai, Herbstlied, Sommergruss, dedicated to Theodor Kirchner)
Four Etudes, Op. 31
Fra Unge Dage, Dandse, Marscher og Karakterstykker, for piano four hands, Op. 32, dedicated to Christian Barnekow
Albumsblade (Three Pieces, dedicated to Bodil Neergaard, née Hartmann), Op. 33
Three Pieces (Toccata, Notturno, Etude), Op. 34
Four Etudes, Op  36
Idyller og Legender, for piano, Op. 37
Danserytmer i forskellig Stil (Nordisk Folkedans, Ländler, Valse, Giga), Op. 38
Minore e Maggiore (Six Pieces dedicated to Godfred Matthison- Hansen), Op. 40
Toccata, Op  43
Aus de Ersten Heimat, Op. 44
Aus Nah und Fern (Nine pieces), Op. 45
Albumblätter, Op  46
Aftenstemning, Op. 47 b
Klaverstykker i Etudeform, Op. 48
Eight  Studies, Op. 51
Aus der Kinderwelt, Fourteen little pieces for small hands, Op. 51
Four Studies, Op. 60 
Humoreske (Den Vægelsindede)
XXV Danske Folkeviser for Piano four hands
 Cadenza for Mozart's Piano Concerto No. 21 in C major
Cadenza for Mozart's Piano Concerto No 23 in a major
Cadenza for Mozart's Piano Concerto No 26 in d major 
 Cadenza for Beethoven's Piano Concerto No. 3 in C minor
 Transcription of ten chorale preludes by Johann Sebastian Bach
 Piano reduction of Niels Gade's cantata Baldurs drøm
 Songs, Romances, Lieder and Hymns (among others Songs for one voice and piano Op. 2, Op. 3, Op. 4, Op. 8, Op.14, Op. 47 a, and Op. 50, and Songs for Choir and Orchestra, Op. 12)
Various other pieces for piano (two and four hands) (Frühlingsstimmung, Albumsblatt in E minor, Sonate facile et instructive, Valse-Impromptu, Ellen-Vals, Valse caractéristique, Romance et Valse mélancolique, Allegro non troppo)

References

External links
 
 August Winding at geni.com
 

1835 births
1899 deaths
Male composers
Danish classical pianists
Danish music educators
Piano pedagogues
University of Music and Theatre Leipzig alumni
19th-century Danish people
19th-century Danish composers
People from Lolland Municipality
Pupils of Carl Reinecke
Academic staff of the Royal Danish Academy of Music
19th-century classical pianists
Male classical pianists
19th-century male musicians
19th-century musicians